Butaleja is a town in Eastern Region of Uganda. It is the main municipal, administrative and commercial center of Butaleja District and the district headquarters are located there. The district is named after the town.

Location

The coordinates of the town are:0°55'30.0"N, 33°56'42.0"E (Latitude:0.9250; Longitude:33.9450).

Population
In 2010, the Uganda Bureau of Statistics (UBOS), estimates the town's population at 5,500. In 2011, UBOS estimated the mid-year population of the town at 5,700. In 2014, the national population census put the population of Butaleja at 19,561.

In 2015, UBOS estimated the population of Butaleja Town Council at 20,200. In 2020, the population agency estimated the mid-year population of the town at 24,000. Of these, 12,000 (50 percent) were females and another 12,000 (50 percent) were males. UBOS calculated the population growth rate of Butaleja Town to average 3.51 percent, annually, between 2015 and 2020.

Points of interest
The following points of interest lie within town:

1. The headquarters of Butaleja District Administration

2. Butaleja Central Market

3. A mobile branch of PostBank Uganda

4. The offices of Butaleja Town Council

See also

References

External links
  To Dispose of Waste In Butaleja, Try The Latrine

Populated places in Eastern Region, Uganda
Butaleja District